Halfan may refer to:
 Halofantrine, an anti-malarial drug
 Halfan culture, 18,000 to 12,500 BC in Nubia and Egypt